Ibadan North-East (Yoruba: Ariwa-Ilaorun Ibadan)  is a Local Government Area in Oyo State, Nigeria. Its headquarters are on Iwo Road. The postal code of the area is 200.

Demographics
It has an area of 18 km and a population of 330,399 at the 2006 census.

References

Local Government Areas in Oyo State